Holcombe is a small village in the south of Devon, England, situated between the much larger coastal towns of Teignmouth and Dawlish. The village has very few facilities, although there are 2 pubs/restaurants, The Smuggler's Inn and The Castle Inn. Holcombe is a typical small English village, with thatched cottages and country lanes. Smugglers Lane at the bottom of the village allows safe access under the railway line to a hidden beach.

References

External links

Villages in Devon
Dawlish